Amrabad (also Romanized as ‘Amrābād; also known as ‘Amrowābād, and ) is a village in Moshkabad Rural District, in the Central District of Arak County, Markazi Province, Iran. At the 2006 census, its population was 948, in 294 families.

References 

Populated places in Arak County